The Montenegrin First League of Men's Handball (in montenegrin Prva Muška Liga) is the top men's team handball league in Montenegro. It is organized by the Handball Federation of Montenegro. In the league participate eight clubs.

The League was established after the Montenegrin independence, with first season started in October 2006.

Competition format

From its establishing, First Montenegrin Handball League regularly consists of eight teams. During the few seasons, in the competition played seven clubs, because the financial or the other problems of some First League members.

League regularly have two parts. During the first part, there is 16 (or 14) weeks. After that, during the second part, four best-placed clubs are playing playoff (TOP4) league for champion, and the others are playing play-out (relegating) league.

At the end of the season, the bottom-placed club is relegating. Every season, champion of the Montenegrin Second League is promoted as a new member of the First League.

Below is a complete record of how many teams played in each season throughout the league's history.

 8 clubs: Montenegrin First League 2006/07
 7 clubs: Montenegrin First League 2007/08
 8 clubs: Montenegrin First League 2008/09
 8 clubs: Montenegrin First League 2009/10
 7 clubs: Montenegrin First League 2010/11
 8 clubs: Montenegrin First League 2011/12
 7 clubs: Montenegrin First League 2012/13
 7 clubs: Montenegrin First League 2013/14
 7 clubs: Montenegrin First League 2014/15

Participants

Since its establishing, in the Montenegrin First League participated 13 different clubs - RK Lovćen Cetinje, RK Sutjeska Nikšić, RK Berane, RK Mojkovac, RK Mornar Bar, RK Budvanska rivijera Budva, RK Rudar Pljevlja, RK Budućnost Podgorica, RK Boka Tivat, RK Danilovgrad, RK Ulcinj, RK Cepelin Cetinje and RK Sedmerac Bar.

During the history of competition, only two towns had more than one First League club - Cetinje and Bar.

Previous First League Seasons

Most of the clubs, during the past, were playing in the SFR Yugoslavia or FR Yugoslavia/Serbia and Montenegro First League - that was RK Lovćen (2 titles of FRY champion and SCG Cup winner), RK Rudar (former Pljevlja), RK Berane (former Raj banka), RK Mornar (former FRY Cup finalist), RK Budućnost and RK Mojkovac (former Brskovo).

Below is a list of Montenegrin clubs which competed in the SFRY, FRY/SCG First League.

 15 seasons: RK Lovćen Cetinje (champions: 2000, 2001; cup winners: 2002, 2003)
 8 seasons: RK Rudar Pljevlja, RK Mornar Bar, RK Berane
 3 seasons: RK Budućnost Podgorica
 1 season: RK Mojkovac

Performances by clubs

Below is a list of First League clubs who have competed in the competition, including the season 2014/15. The teams in bold compete in First League currently. RK Lovćen is the only team that played First League in every season.

 9 seasons: RK Lovćen Cetinje
 8 seasons: RK Sutjeska Nikšić, RK Berane, RK Mojkovac
 7 seasons: RK Budvanska rivijera Budva
 6 seasons: RK Mornar Bar, RK Rudar Pljevlja
 4 seasons: RK Partizan Tivat
 3 seasons: RK Budućnost Podgorica, RK Ulcinj
 2 seasons: RK Danilovgrad, RK Cepelin Cetinje
 1 season: RK Sedmerac Bar

Performances by season

List of Champions (2007 - )

By season

First champion of Montenegro, in the season 2006/07, became RK Lovćen Cetinje. In the next seasons, another three clubs won the trophy (RK Berane, RK Budućnost Podgorica, RK Mojkovac) and Budućnost became first club which won two titles in the row.

In the season 2009/10, Budućnost became the first club to finish a season without losing a point, a feat repeated by Lovćen during the season 2012/13.

By team

Since 2006, four different clubs won the trophy of Montenegrin handball champion. 
Most successful were RK Lovćen Cetinje with 4 titles and now dissolved RK Budućnost Podgorica (2 trophies). With 2 titles from FR Yugoslavia Championship (2000, 2001), two trophies of FRY Cup Winner (2002, 2003) and 5 wins in Montenegrin Cup, RK Lovćen is the most successful participant of Montenegrin First League.
Clubs which have one champions trophy are RK Mojkovac and RK Berane.

European Competitions

Due to EHF ranking list and places distribution, at the season 2014/15. in the European Cups will participate two Montenegrin clubs (1 in EHF Cup, 1 in EHF Challenge Cup).

The greatest performance of one Montenegrin club in the European competitions was noted during the EHF Champions League 2000/01, when RK Lovćen finished at the fifth place.

All-time Montenegrin First League table 

The All-time Montenegrin First League table is a ranking of all Montenegrin handball clubs based on their performance in the Montenegrin First League, the top division of Montenegrin handball. In this ranking 2 points are awarded for a win, 1 for a draw, and 0 for a loss.

Highlighted clubs played in the First League in the 2013/14 season.

Table is not including the results from the actual season (2014/15).

Seasons not including current season (2014/15)

Placement by season 

Below is the list of participants of the First League with their placements during the every single season.

See also 
 Montenegrin First League of Men's Handball
 Montenegrin handball clubs in European competitions
 Montenegrin Second League of Men's Handball
 Montenegrin Men's Handball Cup
 Montenegrin First League of Women's Handball

Handball in Montenegro
Montenegrin handball clubs
Handball leagues in Montenegro